KKRR-LP, UHF analog channel 45, was a low-powered independent television station licensed to Cheyenne, Wyoming, United States. The station was owned by local businessman Robert Rule.

KKRR-LP began as a secondary channel for the co-owned local religious television station, KMAH-LP (channel 39). When KMAH-LP switched over to the Renaissance Network, KKRR-LP took over the Cornerstone Television affiliation.

KMAH-LP later took back the Cornerstone affiliation, after the Renaissance Network folded and its replacement, America One was not renewed. Apparently KMAH-LP did not require KKRR-LP's services. As a result, KKRR-LP was left with no programming. Subsequently, KKRR-LP broadcast only a slate, reminding viewers that Cornerstone programming moved to channel 39.

KKRR-LP's license was canceled by the Federal Communications Commission on July 20, 2021, as the station failed to obtain a license for digital operation by the July 13 deadline.

KRR-LP
Television channels and stations established in 2001
2001 establishments in Wyoming
Defunct television stations in the United States
Television channels and stations disestablished in 2021
2021 disestablishments in Wyoming
KRR-LP